Green Double House is a historic duplex home located at Hannibal, Marion County, Missouri.  It was built in 1857–1858, and was a one-story, "raised cottage" or the "double gallery" clapboard structure on a completely exposed squared rubble basement. The house was divided into two residences. It has been demolished.

It was added to the National Register of Historic Places in 1986.

References

Houses on the National Register of Historic Places in Missouri
Houses completed in 1858
Houses in Hannibal, Missouri
National Register of Historic Places in Marion County, Missouri